A spoonerism is an occurrence in speech in which corresponding consonants, vowels, or morphemes are switched (see metathesis) between two words in a phrase. These are named after the Oxford don and ordained minister William Archibald Spooner, who reputedly did this.

They were already in use by the 16th century by the author François Rabelais and called . In his novel Pantagruel, he wrote  ("insane woman at mass, woman with flabby buttocks").

An example is saying "The Lord is a shoving leopard" instead of "The Lord is a loving shepherd" or "runny babbit" instead of "bunny rabbit." While spoonerisms are commonly heard as slips of the tongue, they can also be used intentionally as a play on words.

Etymology 

Spoonerisms are named after the Reverend William Archibald Spooner (1844–1930), Warden from 1903 to 1924 of New College, Oxford, who was notoriously prone to this mistake.
The Oxford English Dictionary records the word as early as 1900.
The term spoonerism was well established by 1921. An article in The Times from that year reports that:
The boys of Aldro School, Eastbourne, ... have been set the following task for the holidays: Discover and write down something about: The Old Lady of Threadneedle-street, a Spoonerism, a Busman's Holiday...
An article in the Daily Herald in 1928 reported spoonerisms to be a "legend". In that piece Robert Seton, once a student of Spooner's, admitted that Spooner:

...made, to my knowledge, only one "Spoonerism" in his life, in 1879, when he stood in the pulpit and announced the hymn: 'Kinkering Kongs their Titles Take' ["Conquering Kings their Titles Take"]...Later, a friend and myself brought out a book of "spoonerisms"'

In 1937, The Times quoted a detective describing a man as "a bricklabourer's layer" and used "Police Court Spoonerism" as the headline.

A spoonerism is also known as a marrowsky or morowski, purportedly after an 18th-century Polish count who suffered from the same impediment.

Examples 

Most of the quotations attributed to Spooner are apocryphal; The Oxford Dictionary of Quotations (3rd edition, 1979) lists only one substantiated spoonerism: "The weight of rages will press hard upon the employer" (instead of "rate of wages"). Spooner himself claimed that "The Kinquering Congs Their Titles Take" (in reference to a hymn) was his sole spoonerism. Most spoonerisms were probably never uttered by William Spooner himself but rather made up by colleagues and students as a pastime. Richard Lederer, calling "Kinkering Kongs their Titles Take" (with an alternative spelling) one of the "few" authenticated Spoonerisms, dates it to 1879, and he gives nine examples "attributed to Spooner, most of them spuriously." They are as follows:

"Three cheers for our queer old dean!" (while giving a toast at a dinner, which Queen Victoria was also attending)
"Is it kisstomary to cuss the bride?" (as opposed to "customary to kiss")
"The Lord is a shoving leopard." (instead of "a loving shepherd")
"A blushing crow." ("crushing blow")
"A well-boiled icicle" ("well-oiled bicycle")
"You were fighting a liar in the quadrangle." ("lighting a fire")
"Is the bean dizzy?" ("Dean busy")
"Someone is occupewing my pie. Please sew me to another sheet." ("Someone is occupying my pew. Please show me to another seat.")
"You have hissed all my mystery lectures. You have tasted a whole worm. Please leave Oxford on the next town drain." ("You have missed all my history lectures. You have wasted a whole term. Please leave Oxford on the next down train.")

A newspaper column attributes this additional example to Spooner: "A nosey little cook." (as opposed to a "cosy little nook").

Popular use/culture 
In modern terms, spoonerism generally refers to any changing of sounds in this manner.

Comedy 
The Washington, D.C. political comedy sketch group Capitol Steps has a long-standing tradition of performing a routine called "Lirty Dies" during every performance, which features a typically 10-minute-long barrage of rapid-fire topical spoonerisms. A few examples over the years range from "Resident Pagan" (President Reagan) and the US's periodic practice of "Licking their Peaders" (Picking their leaders) to the NSA "poopin' on Snutin" (Snoopin' on Putin) and "phugging everybody's bones" (bugging everybody's phones).
Comedian Jane Ace was notorious for her spoonerisms and other similar plays on words during her run as star of the radio sitcom Easy Aces.

Literature 
 Comedian F. Chase Taylor was the star of the 1930s radio program Stoopnagle and Budd, in which his character, Colonel Stoopnagle, used spoonerisms. In 1945, he published a book, My Tale Is Twisted, consisting of 44 "spoonerised" versions of well-known children's stories. Subtitled "Wart Pun: Aysop's Feebles" and "Tart Pooh: Tairy and Other Fales," these included such tales as "Beeping Sleauty" for "Sleeping Beauty". The book was republished in 2001 by Stone and Scott Publishers as Stoopnagle's Tale is Twisted.
 In 2005, HarperCollins published the late humorist Shel Silverstein's Runny Babbit: A Billy Sook, a book about a rabbit whose parents "Dummy and Mad" gave him spoonerized chores, such as having to "Dash the wishes" (for "wash the dishes").
In his poem "Translation," Brian P. Cleary describes a boy named Alex who speaks in spoonerisms (like "shook a tower" instead of "took a shower"). Humorously, Cleary leaves the poem's final spoonerism up to the reader when he says,

Music 
 The title of the Van der Graaf Generator's album Pawn Hearts resulted from a spoonerism by David Jackson, who said one time: "I'll go down to the studio and dub on some more porn hearts", meaning to say 'horn parts'.
 American indie rock musician Ritt Momney's name is a spoonerism of the name of the American politician Mitt Romney.
 American synthwave musician Com Truise's name is a spoonerism of the name of American actor Tom Cruise.
 Estonian complextro musician Mord Fustang's name is a spoonerism of the well-known Ford Mustang muscle car.
 English rapper Loyle Carner's stage name is a spoonerism of his double-barrelled surname Coyle-Larner as well as a reference to his childhood struggle with his ADHD and dyslexia diagnoses.

Radio 
On a 3 December 1950 episode of The Jack Benny Program in which Jack mentions that he ran into his butler Rochester while in his car that was on a grease rack. Mary Livingston was supposed to say "How could you run into him on a grease rack?" but flubbed her line with "How could you run into him on a grass reek?" The audience broke up into so much laughter Jack was unable to reply as the show ran out of time.

False etymology 
Spoonerisms are sometimes used in false etymologies. For example, according to linguist Ghil'ad Zuckermann, some wrongly believe that the English word butterfly derives from 'utter y'''.

 Kniferisms and forkerisms 
As complements to spoonerism, Douglas Hofstadter used the nonce words kniferism and forkerism to refer to changing, respectively, the vowels or the final consonants of two syllables, giving them a new meaning. Examples of so-called kniferisms include a British television newsreader once referring to the police at a crime scene removing a 'hypodeemic nerdle'; a television announcer once saying that "All the world was thrilled by the marriage of the Duck and Doochess of Windsor"; and during a live broadcast in 1931, radio presenter Harry von Zell accidentally mispronouncing US President Herbert Hoover's name as "Hoobert Heever."

 See also 

Blooper
Crash blossom
Freudian slip
Malapropism
Metathesis
MondegreenOpperlandse taal- & letterkundeParody
Phonemic paraphasia
Phonetic reversal
Portmanteau words
SananmuunnosSmart Feller Fart Smeller: And Other Spoonerisms'' (book)
Bushism

Notes

References

External links 

 Lists of spoonerisms at fun-with-words.com
 The Straight Dope: Who was Dr. Spooner?

Culture in Oxford
Figures of speech
Humour
Speech error
Word play
Terms for quotations of notable persons